Salicylamide (o-hydroxybenzamide or amide of salicyl) is a non-prescription drug with analgesic and antipyretic properties. Its medicinal uses are similar to those of aspirin.  Salicylamide is used in combination with both aspirin and caffeine in the over-the-counter pain remedy PainAid.  It was also an ingredient in the over-the-counter pain remedy BC Powder but was removed from the formulation in 2009, and Excedrin used the ingredient from
1960 to 1980 in conjunction with aspirin, acetaminophen, and caffeine. It was used in later formulations of Vincent's powders in Australia as a substitute for phenacetin.

Derivatives
Derivatives of salicylamide include ethenzamide, labetalol, medroxalol, lopirin, otilonium, oxyclozanide, salicylanilide, niclosamide, and raclopride.

See also
4-Aminosalicylic acid 
Mesalazine
Salsalate

References

External links
 Safety MSDS data

Analgesics
Antipyretics
 
3-Hydroxypropenals